Queen Elizabeth's Grammar School, Alford (QEGS) is a selective, co-educational, academy status Grammar School and Sixth Form in Alford, Lincolnshire, England. In 2021, the school held 544 pupils.

The headteacher is G.Thompson.

History
The school motto is Cor Unum Via Una which translates as "One heart, one way," and is also the title of the school song.
The school was first established in 1566 with the donation of £50 from an Alford merchant. In 1576 a charter was granted by Queen Elizabeth I "for the Education, Instruction and bringing up of children and Youth for ever to continue." In 1959, a new block was added to the school in preparation for the admittance of girls. The school attained grant-maintained status in 1989, and in 1999 was given Foundation status.

Notable former pupils

 Adrian Benjamin, former actor
 Glenn Kirkham, England national team and GB hockey player
 Ted Smith (conservationist), who founded The Wildlife Trusts
 Air Marshal Sir John Sutton KCB, Lieutenant Governor of Jersey 1990-05
 Sir William Hotham, barrister, serious fraud.

Former teachers
 Francis Marbury in 1585

Notes

External links
 School website
 BBC League Table Entry

Grammar schools in Lincolnshire
Educational institutions established in the 1560s
1566 establishments in England
Academies in Lincolnshire

Alford, Lincolnshire